The Remington Model 870 is a pump-action shotgun manufactured by Remington Arms Company, LLC. It is widely used by the public for shooting sports, hunting and self-defense, as well as by law enforcement and military organizations worldwide.

Development
The Remington 870 was the fourth major design in a series of Remington pump shotguns. John Pedersen designed the fragile Remington Model 10 (and later the improved Remington Model 29). John Browning designed the Remington Model 17 (which was later adapted by Ithaca into the Ithaca 37), which served as the basis for the Remington 31. The Model 31 was marketed as the “ball-bearing repeater” and was well-received, but its many machined and handfitted parts made the gun expensive to manufacture. Consequently, it struggled in sales compared to the Winchester Model 12. To achieve better sales, Remington produced the Model 870 in 1950, which was more modern and reliable in its construction, easy to take apart and maintain, and relatively inexpensive.

The 870 was a commercial success. Remington sold two million guns by 1973 (ten times the number of Model 31 shotguns it replaced). As of 1983, the 870 held the record for the best-selling shotgun in history, with three million sold. By 1996, spurred by sales of the basic "Express" models, which were added as a lower-cost alternative to the original Wingmaster line, sales topped seven million guns. On April 13, 2009, the ten millionth Model 870 was produced.

Design details
The 870 features a bottom-loading, side ejecting receiver and a tubular magazine under the barrel. The gun comes with a plug for migratory bird hunting which reduces the magazine's capacity to two rounds. It has dual action bars, internal hammer, and a bolt which locks into an extension in the barrel. The action, receiver, fire control group, safety catch and slide release catch of the Remington Model 870 shotgun are similar to those used on the Remington Model 7600 series pump-action centerfire rifles and carbines. The basic fire control group design was first used in the automatic 11–48. Twelve gauge stocks will also interchange on the older 12-gauge-sized 20-gauge receivers, although modification is needed to fit the smaller sized 20-gauge receivers employed since the late 1970s. Several parts of the 870, such as buttstocks and magazine tubes, will interchange with the semi-automatic Remington 1100 and 11–87.

The original 870 models were offered with fixed chokes. In 1986 Remington introduced the new Remington "Rem Choke" system of screw-in chokes (also fitted to Remington model 1100 auto-loading shotguns at the same time).  Initially, the Rem Chokes were offered only in 12 gauge in barrel lengths of 21", 26", and 28".  The following year the availability was expanded to the 20 gauge and included other barrel lengths.

The 870's production for over 30 years had a design whereby a user could fail to press a shell all the way into the magazine when loading - so that the shell latch did not engage the shell - which could result in tying up the gun. This was caused by the shell slipping out of the magazine under the bolt in the receiver to bind the action, requiring rough treatment of the action or even disassembly. The potential issue was resolved with the introduction of the "Flexi Tab" carrier. Guns with this modification can be identified by the "U"-shaped cut-out on the carrier, visible from below the gun. The cut-out, combined with a modified machining on the underside of the slide assembly, allows the action to be opened with a shell on the carrier.

Variants

There are hundreds of variations of the Remington 870 in 12, 16, 20, 28 gauges and .410 bore. All Remington 870 versions are built on the same platform and receiver, but there are small differences that can be more than just cosmetic. In 1969, Remington introduced 28 gauge and .410 bore models on a new scaled-down receiver size, and in 1972, a 20-gauge Lightweight ("LW") version was introduced on the same sized receiver, and all of the smaller gauges today are produced on that size receiver. From the original fifteen models offered, Remington currently produces dozens of models for civilian, law enforcement, and military sales. 870 variants can be grouped into the following:

Norinco imitation
Chinese arms company Norinco has made unlicensed copies of the Remington 870, as the design is no longer under patent protection. The most common of these designs are the Norinco HP9-1 and M-98, the difference being that the HP9-1 has either a 12.5" or 14" barrel, whereas the M-98 has an 18.5" barrel. In the United States, where most Norinco products are specifically non-importable, this shotgun was imported and sold under the names Norinco Hawk 982 and Interstate Hawk 982.

Users

See also
 Combat shotgun
 Knight's Armament Company Masterkey
 List of individual weapons of the U.S. Armed Forces

References

External links

 Remington page for 870
  A guide to Collecting Remington 870 Shotguns from Remington Society
 Remington page for 870 Tactical
 Remington Military MCS page 
 Important differences between Remington 870 Police and 870 Express shotguns

Cold War firearms of the United States
Police weapons
Pump-action shotguns
Remington Arms firearms
United States Marine Corps equipment
Shotguns of the United States
Military equipment introduced in the 1950s